Gabon participated at the 2018 Summer Youth Olympics in Buenos Aires, Argentina from 6 October to 18 October 2018.

Competitors

Judo

Swimming

Taekwondo

 Girls' -55 kg - Merveille Marindi

References

2018 in Gabonese sport
Nations at the 2018 Summer Youth Olympics
2018